Cime de la Bonette (el. ) is a mountain in the French Alps, near the border with Italy. It is situated within the Mercantour National Park on the border of the departments of Alpes-Maritimes and Alpes-de-Haute-Provence, between the Ubaye Valley and the valley of the Tinée River.

"Cime" means "summit" in French.

The summit is surrounded by road from the Col de la Bonette, which reaches  , and is the second highest paved through route in the Alps. It is also the highest point reached by the Tour de France.

See also
 Col de Restefond
 List of highest paved roads in Europe
 List of mountain passes

References

External links 
Map of the Col de la Bonette and the Col de Restefond

Mountains of Alpes-Maritimes
Mountains of Alpes-de-Haute-Provence
Mountains of the Alps
Two-thousanders of France